Louise Patricia Crane (born 8 December 1984) is a Northern Irish singer-songwriter and visual artist. She is known for her unique blend of romantic escapism and dreamlike progressive rock, leading to music journalist Dom Lawson dubbing her "The new queen of psychedelic prog".

Born in Belfast, Northern Ireland, Crane began her career in music fronting gothic rock band Solemn Novena in 2006, with whom she gained a small following and performed on both of their releases. In 2016 she joined The Eden House and debuted on their 2017 album Songs for the Broken Ones.

Crane made her solo debut in 2020, with the album Deep Blue which included contributions from progressive rock veterans Jakko Jakszyk and Ian Anderson, and Fireball Ministry bassist Scott Reeder. In the United Kingdom, the album entered the Official Rock & Metal Albums Chart at number 8, and the Official Independent Albums Chart at number 20.

At the end of 2020, Crane ranked number 5 in Prog's Readers' Poll of the Best Female Vocalists.

Outside of her music career, Crane is a visual artist and has produced album artworks for the band Grooving in Green, and vocalist Monica Richards.

Career

Solemn Novena: 2006–2010

In early 2006, with the intent of bringing guitar orientated goth rock back to the forefront of the UK goth scene, Crane along with friends Stuart Harland, Marc McCourt, and Andi Effe formed gothic rock band Solemn Novena.
An EP titled As Darkness Falls was released that December, but it wasn't until four years later that their full-length debut album Kiss The Girls was released.
Due to various reasons the band split up only two months after the release of their debut album in July 2010.

Raven Adore: 2011–2013
After the dissolution of Solemn Novena, Crane and band mate Stuart Harland formed alternative band Raven Adore in 2011.

The following summer, the band recorded five songs for an EP titled Let's Watch Flowers Bloom which was released as a limited edition run of 100 hand numbered digipaks in October 2012. This would ultimately be the band's only release, as Crane and Harland ended the project soon after.

The Eden House: 2016–present

Sometime in 2013, Crane auditioned for musical ensemble The Eden House by sending through her versions of the tracks "All My Love" and "Trashed Treasure", both originally performed with Julianne Regan on vocals, and a demo of one of her own compositions, "Misery".

In October 2016, it was publicly announced that Crane would be joining the band as a new vocalist and would be appearing on their third studio album, Songs for the Broken Ones. Following the release, the band embarked on a UK tour and two European festival events culminating in a live album for Record Store Day.

Solo career
Following the recording of The Eden House album Songs for the Broken Ones, Crane relocated to Cambridge to embark on her solo career, enlisting The Eden House founder and producer Stephen Carey.

Progressive rock veterans Jakko Jakszyk of King Crimson and Ian Anderson of Jethro Tull would later join the project resulting in the album Deep Blue.

In the United Kingdom, the album entered the Official Rock & Metal Albums Chart at number 8, and the Official Independent Albums Chart at number 20.

Crane released the piano and vocal track "Springtime" on 17th March 2022 via Bandcamp having composed, written, produced, recorded and mixed the song herself, in her home studio. On this date she also announced a brief update on her second solo album, which she is in the process of writing and co-producing with King Crimson guitarist and singer, Jakko Jakszyk.

Peculiar Doll records
Peculiar Doll Records is a British record label, founded by Crane in 2019.

The label was created for the release of her solo album Deep Blue, with Crane herself illustrating logos, graphically designing packaging and advertisements, and shipping select releases.
Distribution and marketing are handled by Bad Omen Records via Plastic Head Music Distribution Ltd.

Artwork

Aside from music, Crane is also a visual artist who works with mixed media.

Early in the creation process for the album Deep Blue, Crane visualised each song as having a corresponding piece of artwork, owing to her chromesthesia. Eight abstract pieces were created and later sold with a deluxe edition of the album.

Crane was commissioned to create the cover artwork for Grooving in Green, a band featuring her Eden House band mate and solo album collaborator Simon Rippin, for their 2019 album A Second Chance....

Personal life
Crane experiences the perceptual phenomenon chromesthesia, a form of synesthesia that involuntarily evokes an experience of colour and imagery while listening to music.

During an interview with Metal-Discovery, it was revealed that Crane is a trained falconer, having grown up with falconry, and during childhood having thirty or forty different birds of prey.

Although left-handed, she plays a right-handed bass guitar.

Discography

Studio albums
Deep Blue (2020)

with Solemn Novena
As Darkness Falls EP (2006)
Kiss The Girls (2010)

with Raven Adore
Let's Watch Flowers Bloom EP (2012)

with The Eden House
Songs for the Broken Ones (2017)
Live in Session (2018)

References

Artists from Northern Ireland
Women musicians from Northern Ireland
Singer-songwriters from Northern Ireland
1984 births
Living people
Rock musicians from Northern Ireland